Berlin Township is a civil township of Ionia County in the U.S. state of Michigan. As of the 2000 census, the township population was 2,787.

History
Berlin Township was organized in 1839 with Alonzo Sessions as the first supervisor.

Communities
Doris was the name of a post office in this township from 1899 until 1901.
Gridley was the name of a post office here from 1900 to 1901.
 The city of Ionia is adjacent to the northeast and has incorporated a small portion of land in the township.
 The village of Saranac is adjacent to the west.

Geography

Demographics
The racial makeup of the township was 81.59% White, 13.81% African American, 1.40% Native American, 0.39% Asian, 0.79% from other races, and 2.01% from two or more races. Hispanic or Latino of any race were 2.22% of the population.

There were 689 households, out of which 36.3% had children under the age of 18 living with them, 68.7% were married couples living together, 7.3% had a female householder with no husband present, and 20.6% were non-families. 17.4% of all households were made up of individuals, and 7.7% had someone living alone who was 65 years of age or older. The average household size was 2.65 and the average family size was 2.98.

In the township the population was spread out, with 16.9% under the age of 18, 9.8% from 18 to 24, 40.1% from 25 to 44, 24.5% from 45 to 64, and 8.7% who were 65 years of age or older. The median age was 38 years. For every 100 females, there were 200.6 males. For every 100 females age 18 and over, there were 234.8 males.

The median income for a household in the township was $48,158, and the median income for a family was $55,852. Males had a median income of $40,867 versus $27,563 for females. The per capita income for the township was $16,780. About 4.0% of families and 5.9% of the population were below the poverty line, including 4.8% of those under age 18 and 6.8% of those age 65 or over.

References

Notes

Sources

Townships in Ionia County, Michigan
Grand Rapids metropolitan area
1839 establishments in Michigan
Townships in Michigan